Ventosilla de la Tercia is a locality and minor local entity located in the municipality of Villamanín, in León province, Castile and León, Spain. As of 2020, it has a population of 77.

Geography 
Ventosilla de la Tercia is located 48km north of León, Spain.

References

Populated places in the Province of León